Aaron Harris may refer to:

 Aaron Harris (Isis drummer)
 Aaron Harris (Islands drummer)
 Aaron Harris (politician)